Trapped in the Closet: Chapters 23–33 (also known as Trapped in the Closet: The Next Installment) is a 2012 series of music videos and the third installment of the Trapped in the Closet series by R&B artist R. Kelly. In a then-recent interview, Kelly said the new installment would feature 11 new chapters when it premiered, along with another 30, which would be filmed in January 2013. When this saga premiered, it featured the return of several cast members, including the main character, Sylvester, played by Kelly.

This set of chapters picks up where the original Trapped in the Closet left off. These chapters allude to mysterious phone calls all of the cast members have been receiving. Also, the characters talk, in confessional style, about different things going on in their lives. Moreover, these chapters are a precursor to the reunion of all of the cast members on a television show called Out of the Closet with Larry. The chapters also update the personal lives of some of the main couples in the series such as Cathy and Rufus, and Roxanne and Tina.

Chapters 23–33

Chapter 23
This chapter begins with Sylvester and Gwendolyn watching TV and getting a mysterious phone call. The scene then shifts to Cathy and Rufus who decided to go shopping downtown. Cathy's phone rings and she exclaims "it's those people again". Rufus tells her to hang up. Bridgette, Twan, and most of the rest of the cast also get a mysterious phone call, offering money in exchange for an unknown service.
Ending cliffhanger-outro line: "But there was no luck when it came to getting in touch with Chuck. Where are you, Chuck?"

Chapter 24
This chapter begins with Twan's winning a bet during a sports game at the local barber shop. Meanwhile, outside, Pimp Lucius is yelling at his prostitutes over the lack of money that has been coming in. He then warns that if he does not get his money soon, he will start hitting the girls. It is revealed that he is responsible for Tina's nervous twitch. Sylvester and Twan come outside. After a comical encounter with Lucius, they attempt to walk away, ending the chapter.
Ending cliffhanger-outro line: "Sylvester, you real funny."

Chapter 25
This chapter begins directly after the previous one ends, as Pimp Lucius calls Sylvester over to ask him for a couple of "racks". He then says that he will repay Sylvester the first chance he gets. Sylvester tells Lucius that he needs to go and see his parents, and then Sylvester and Twan depart from the scene, frustrating Lucius.
Ending cliffhanger-outro line: "Now just stop it! Go get the car! Go!"

Chapter 26
This chapter contains Cathy's confessional for Out of the Closet with Larry and her ultimatum to her husband Rufus.
The chapter switches to a pan of the door of Doctor William T. Perry, a marriage counselor. The doctor is getting off the phone as Rufus and an impatient Cathy walk into the room. Rufus is reluctant at first and asks the doctor not to record their session. Cathy then breaks down and begins to cry over the fact that Rufus loves a man more than her. Rufus then admits he is confused and still loves Chuck.
Ending cliffhanger-outro line: "What have I done?"

Chapter 27
This chapter begins with Rufus' getting on his knees and praying to God to change his ways. Meanwhile, Dr. Perry tries to convince Cathy to go back inside the room and console Rufus as well as make amends. He relates the story of how upset he is about a couple who had a relationship that he was unable to help them fix. He pleads with Cathy not to destroy her own relationship. Back in the office, Rufus calls out to God asking how he was going to help him. Just as he does this, Cathy comes back into the room and forgives Rufus, saying she is willing to work it out.

The chapter then switches to Rufus' confessional. Rufus was tricked into coming on the show by the staff. He believed he was there to talk about the church and the community, but instead he was bombarded by questions about his personal life. After an insinuation by an off-screen director, he leaves the set.

Ending cliffhanger-outro line: "Does Chuck have AIDS? Is that what the Package is?! Sir? Sir, are you gonna answer the question?"

Chapter 28
Rosie and Randolph are the central plot for this chapter. Randolph cannot sleep. He wakes Rosie up and asks her if she meant it when she called him "Mr. Can't-Get-It-Up" in Chapter 13. Rosie tries to end the conversation but Randolph begins dancing around, taunting her,  saying that he is going to take off his pajamas and flash her. The doorbell rings, interrupting their shenanigans, and Randolph goes to answer it. The scene switches to Rosy in her confessional. She calls Randolph "89" and insinuates that he has a tiny penis. Then the scene switches to Randolph's confessional. He attempts to defend himself from Rosie's insinuations; she comes on the set and they begin to fight comically. The off-screen director is yelling for them to stop, but they only continue.
Ending cliffhanger-outro line: "Oh, you want some of this, don't ya?"

Chapter 29
This chapter begins with the Reverend Mosley James Evans in an advertisement for his new book, Trapped in the Closet. He dances around and compares his book to the Bible. The scene changes to Roxanne talking about the preacher to Tina, saying that the man is a con artist. Tina tells Roxanne not to say such things about the Reverend. A fight ensues, and Tina ends up dumping Roxanne, saying that she is going to find Twan. The chapter then moves to Tina's confessional. She says that she appreciated Roxanne taking her in but it is now time for her to find her own identity. She also says that she will be appearing on the Out of the Closet show. The scene then switches to Roxanne's confessional. She talks about how ungrateful Tina is acting and says that the argument is not over.
Ending cliffhanger-outro line: "Twan? She crazy if she thinking she's leaving me for his gorilla-body-having ass. OK?"

Chapter 30
On the opening of this chapter, Sylvester and Twan are in a private garage going over their plans for a future meeting with an unknown gangster. Twan lifts his shirt up and shows Sylvester that he bought a gun; Sylvester takes it from him until after the deal. Sylvester warns him again about the delirious mobster they are about to meet. The two then get into the car. The chapter then switches to the simultaneous confessional of both Sylvester and Twan. Twan starts off by saying that Sylvester never lets him have fun. Sylvester then informs the viewers that Twan likes to talk a lot but cannot really back it up. He then informs Twan that true thugs move in silence. After a comical dialogue, the chapter ends with their laughing.
Ending cliffhanger-outro line: "Man, you gotta love this man."

Chapter 31
This chapter involves Pimp Lucius' going home to see his parents, who turn out to be Randolph and Rosie. Randolph is angry at first and does not want to let Lucius in, but Rosie insists that he comes in. She gets mad at Randolph and calls him by his middle name, Douglas. The chapter continues with Lucius' explaining the mysterious phone calls he has been getting and his need for money and a place to sleep. It ends with Randolph's answering the door again to find Lucius' prostitutes whom he compares to En Vogue.
Ending cliffhanger-outro line: "It's En Vogue, with a new lead singer."

Chapter 32
Pimp Lucius chews out his prostitutes trying to learn why they did not remain in the car while he talked to his parents. The girls say the blind prostitute got worried and asked them to go up to the door to find out if Lucius was okay. Pimp Lucius does not believe them and sends them back to the car. The chapter then moves to the dramatic confessional of Pimp Lucius alongside his four prostitutes. He talks about his father's denying him money and a place to sleep. He wonders how his father could have done this to him, considering the fact that he is family.
Ending cliffhanger-outro line: "Call me a pimp, a thug, I'm still his blood. How could he do this to me? Church!"

Chapter 33
This chapter involves Sylvester and Twan's meeting up with the mobster Beeno. The conclusion of Part 3 begins with the character Bankhead, who opens the door and is at first reluctant to let the men in. He warns and threatens them and then guides them to Beeno. Beeno is eating sunflower seeds while listening to Sylvester's proposal. Something seems to be bothering Beeno's throat and he reveals that Joey shot him in the neck during a past deal. Beeno does not care for Sylvester's humor and tells his men to kill them after revealing that he is aware that Sylvester was making deals with the Italians. Twan saves the day and takes Bankhead's gun. The two men flee.

Then the melody changes to an upbeat one as Bankhead and his crew chase Sylvester and Twan. The two men run and end up hiding behind a garbage bin. After assuring himself that they have not been followed, Sylvester reveals to Twan that they are standing outside the back entrance to the show Out of the Closet with Larry, the very show that the cast has been doing the confessionals for. The two men walk inside. The chapter ends as the show is about to begin.
Ending cliffhanger-outro line: "Ladies and Gentlemen, welcome to the Out of the Closet show. Now give it up for your host, Larry!"

Cast
 Robert Kelly as Sylvester, Randolph, Rev. Mosley James Evans, Pimp Lucius, the narrator, Dr. Perry, and Beeno 
 LeShay Tomlinson as Cathy
 Rolando A. Boyce as Rufus
 Michael Kenneth Williams as Sgt. James
 Cat Wilson as Gwendolyn
 Eric Lane as Twan
 La Donna Tittle as Rosie
 Drevon Cooks as Big Man
 Tracey Bonner as Tina
 Erika Ringor as Roxanne
 Javon "Faz" Johnson as Bankhead

List of Trapped in the Closet Characters

Main Characters 

 The Narrator
 Sylvester  
 Twan  
 Gwendolyn  
 Cathy  
 Rufus   
 Chuck   
 Sergeant James 
 Bridget  
 Big Man  
 Rosie
 Randolph  
 Tina  
 Roxanne 
 Pimp Lucius

Other Characters 

 Reverend James Moseley 
 Joey    
 Bishop Craig  
 Myrna  
 O'dale  
 Dr Perry  
 Bankhead  
 Beeno  
 Larry

References

R. Kelly
2012 television films
2012 films
Trapped in the Closet
2010s English-language films